Carla Robbins is an American journalist, national security expert, and the former deputy editorial page editor of The New York Times. Prior to her career at The New York Times, Robbins worked for BusinessWeek, U.S. News & World Report, and The Wall Street Journal. During her thirteen-year career at The Wall Street Journal, she won multiple prestigious awards and was a member of two Pulitzer Prize-winning reporting teams.

Career
Robbins graduated from Wellesley College in 1974, with a bachelor's degree in political science. She subsequently attended University of California, Berkeley, receiving master and doctorate degrees also in political science.

In 1982, Robbins worked as an editor and, later, as a State Department reporter for BusinessWeek. In 1986, she began working as the Latin America bureau chief for U.S. News & World Report, where she later became a senior diplomatic correspondent. She left U.S. News & World Report in 1992. In 1993 she began working as a reporter and news editor at The Wall Street Journal, going on to be their lead writer on foreign policy.  In July 2006, she began working as an editor at The New York Times. In January 2007, she became the deputy editorial page editor. In July 2012, Robbins resigned from The New York Times to take time to work on a book project. It was also announced that she will consult for The New York Times on expanding their "global opinion report." She is the program director of Masters in International Affairs and a Clinical Professor at Baruch College. She is an adjunct senior fellow in the Council on Foreign Relations. 

A foreign policy commentator, she is considered an expert on national security and defense issues, with a particular focus on Iran and North Korea,  American politics and foreign policy, Washington’s budget battles, defense spending, and US military rivalries and interventions.

Awards
In 1984, while working at BusinessWeek, Robbins was one of the recipients of an Overseas Press Club award. In 1990, she received a Nieman Fellowship from Harvard University.  In 2004, she shared the Elizabeth Neuffer Award for Print Journalism from the U.N. Correspondents Association and the Peter R. Weitz Senior Prize from the German Marshall Fund .  In 2005, she was a Hoover Media Fellow at Stanford University.

Robbins has been a member of two teams that have been awarded the Pulitzer Prize. In 1999, she and a team of reporters at The Wall Street Journal won the Pulitzer Prize for International Reporting for their coverage of the 1998 Russian financial crisis. The following year, she was a member of a team who were awarded the Pulitzer Prize for National Reporting for stories examining U.S. defense spending and military decisions following the Cold War.

In 2003, she was awarded the Georgetown University Weintal Prize for Diplomatic Reporting.

Notes

External links

Year of birth missing (living people)
Living people
The New York Times writers
Nieman Fellows
Wellesley College alumni
University of California, Berkeley alumni
Baruch College faculty